Robert Charles Ross Jr. (born June 24, 1989) is an American professional baseball pitcher for the Wild Health Genomes of the Atlantic League of Professional Baseball. He has played in Major League Baseball (MLB) for the Texas Rangers and Boston Red Sox.

Amateur career
Ross was born and raised in Lexington, Kentucky. He attended Lexington Christian Academy, where he competed in both baseball and soccer. Ross had a 1.98 career earned run average (ERA) with 176 strikeouts in 116 innings pitched, and also batted .404 with 52 runs batted in and 33 stolen bases. During his senior year, Ross was selected as the Gatorade Baseball Player of the Year in Kentucky.

Professional career

Texas Rangers
The Texas Rangers selected Ross in the second round of the 2008 Major League Baseball draft.

In 2011, he had a 10-5 win–loss record with a 2.34 ERA with the Class A Myrtle Beach Pelicans and Double-A Frisco RoughRiders.

Ross made the Rangers opening day roster out of spring training in 2012.  He made his major league debut on April 8, 2012 against the Chicago White Sox.  Robbie's first strikeout victim was Paul Konerko.  His first major league victory came April 14, 2012 against the Minnesota Twins in relief of Yu Darvish. The very next day, he picked up his second victory, also against the Twins, in relief of Neftalí Feliz.

Boston Red Sox
On January 27, 2015, the Rangers traded Ross to the Boston Red Sox in exchange for pitcher Anthony Ranaudo.

In his first season with the Red Sox, Ross appeared in 54 games, collecting an 0-2 record, with a 3.86 ERA, striking out 53 batters. In 2015, Ross had a solid season posting a 3.86 ERA in 54 appearances, and even serving as the Red Sox closer for a brief time. He would amass the only 6 saves of his MLB career in 2015.

In 2016, Ross was an integral part of the Boston bullpen, appearing in 54 games, racking up 55.1 innings, to the tune of a 3-2 record and 56 strikeouts. Ross' 2017 season was cut short due to a back injury, he appeared in only 8 games. He was outrighted off the roster after the season and he elected to become a free agent.

Chicago White Sox
Ross signed a minor league deal with the Chicago White Sox on March 4, 2018. He was released on June 9, 2018.

Pittsburgh Pirates
On March 4, 2019, Ross signed a minor league deal with the Pittsburgh Pirates. He was released on March 25, 2019.

Sugar Land Skeeters
On June 19, 2019, Ross signed with the Sugar Land Skeeters of the independent Atlantic League of Professional Baseball. He was released on July 22, 2019.

Sugar Land Lightning Sloths
In July 2020, Ross signed on to play for the Sugar Land Lightning Sloths of the Constellation Energy League (a makeshift 4-team independent league created as a result of the COVID-19 pandemic) for the 2020 season.

Detroit Tigers
On January 16, 2021, Ross signed a minor league contract with the Detroit Tigers organization. He was assigned to the Triple-A Toledo Mud Hens to begin the year. Ross appeared in 27 games for Triple-A Toledo, going 2-8 with a 7.03 ERA and 26 strikeouts. On August 6, 2021, Ross retired from professional baseball.

Wild Health Genomes
On May 3, 2022, Ross came out of retirement to sign with the Wild Health Genomes of the Atlantic League of Professional Baseball.

References

External links

1989 births
Living people
Bakersfield Blaze players
Baseball players from Lexington, Kentucky
Boston Red Sox players
Charlotte Knights players
Frisco RoughRiders players
Hickory Crawdads players
Major League Baseball pitchers
Myrtle Beach Pelicans players
Pawtucket Red Sox players
Round Rock Express players
Spokane Indians players
Sugar Land Skeeters players
Texas Rangers players